Remixes EP is an EP by The Postmarks, released in 2006.

Track listing
"Goodbye (LP Version)" – 3:29
"You Drift Away (LP Version)" – 3:48
"Goodbye (Tahiti 80 Remix)" – 3:08
"Goodbye (Bitstream Dream Remix)" – 3:31
"Goodbye (James Iha Remix)" – 3:13
"Goodbye (Spookey Ruben Remix)" – 3:42
"Goodbye (Ma Radio Star Remix)" – 3:16
"You Drift Away (The Saturday Club Remix)" – 3:42
"You Drift Away (Brookville Remix)" – 4:20

2006 EPs
The Postmarks albums